is an annual award given to distinguished literary works and activities in the sectors literature and art, humanities and social science, natural science, and encyclopedic work, plus a special award. It was founded in 1947 and is sponsored by the Mainichi Newspapers Co., the publishing house of the Mainichi Shimbun.

Recipients (selected)

1947
 Literature and art award for Jun'ichirō Tanizaki for Sasameyuki (The Makioka Sisters)
 Literature and art award for Yuriko Miyamoto for Kazeshirigusa and Harimaheiya

1948
 Literature and art award for Michio Takeyama for Biruma no tategoto

1951
 Literature and art award for Kōnosuke Hinatsu for Nihon gendaishi taikei

1952
 Literature and art award for Hiroshi Noma for Shinkū chitai

1954
 Literature and art award for Sue Sumii for Yoru ake asa ake

1955
 Literature and art award for Ken Domon for Murō-ji
 Literature and art award for Shigeharu Nakano for Muragimo

1958
 Literature and art award for Shūsaku Endō for Umi to dokuyaku

1959
 Literature and art award for Shūgorō Yamamoto for Mominoki wa nokotta
 Literature and art award for Saisei Murō for Waga aisuru shijin no denki
 Literature and art award for Junji Kinoshita for Dorama no sekai

1960
 Literature and art award for Tomie Ōhara for En to iu onna

1961
 Literature and art award for Shōhei Ōoka for Kaei
 Literature and art award for Tarō Okamoto for Wasurerareta nihon

1962
 Literature and art award for Yasunari Kawabata for Nemure bijo (The House of the Sleeping Beauties)

1963
 Literature and art award for Kazuo Hirotsu for Nengatsu no ahioto

1964
 Literature and art award for Morio Kita for Nireke no hitobito (The House of Nire)

1965
 Literature and art award for Haruo Umezaki for Genka

1966
 Literature and art award for Junji Kinoshita for Mugenkidō

1967
 Literature and art award for Shōtarō Yasuoka for Maku ga orite kara

1968
 Literature and art award for Takeshi Kaikō for Kagayakeru yami

1969
 Literature and art award for Jūkichi Uno for Shingeki tanoshi kanashi

1972
 Literature and art award for Junzō Shōno for Akio to Ryoji

1973
 Literature and art award for Akira Abe for Sennen

1974
 Literature and art award for Saburō Shiroyama for Rakujitsu moyu
 Literature and art award for Shin'ichirō Nakamura for Kono hyakunen no shōsetsu

1976
 Literature and art award for Hideo Takubo for Kami no wa

1977
 Literature and art award for Kenji Nakagami for Karekinada

1978
 Literature and art award for Chikao Tanaka for Gekiteki buntairon josetsu

1994
 Literature and art award for Hiroyuki Agawa for Shiga Naoya

1995
 Literature and art award for Tadao Satō for Nihon eiga-shi

2001
 Literature and art award for Taeko Tomioka for Arikuchi Shinobu nōto

2004
 Literature and art award for Kazushige Abe for Shinsemia

2005
 Literature and art award for Ryū Murakami for Hanto o deyo (From the Fatherland, with Love)

2007
 Literature and art award for Shuichi Yoshida for Akunin (Villain)

2009
 Literature and art award for Haruki Murakami for 1Q84

2020
 Humanities and social science award for Takehiko Kariya for Oitsuita Kindai Keita Kindai (Who killed Japan's Modernity? What Comes after 'Catch-Up?')

References

Japanese literary awards
Poetry awards
Non-fiction literary awards